NYC BigApps is an annual competition sponsored by the New York City Economic Development Corporation. It provides programmers, developers, designers, and entrepreneurs with access to municipal data sets to build technological products that address civic issues affecting New York City. Through the NYC Open Data portal and other private and non-profit data sources, contestants have access to more than 1,000 data sets and APIs. Examples of available data include weekly traffic updates, schedules of citywide events, property sales records, catalogs of restaurant inspections, and geographic data about the location of school and voting districts. The contest is part of a broader New York City effort to increase government transparency and encourage entrepreneurship.

Results & challenges 

Some contest winners have gone on to become viable companies.  For example, MyCityWay, was a contest winner in 2010. MyCityWay subsequently raised venture capital funding from FirstMark Capital and IA Ventures, as well as a strategic investment from BMW.  Embark NYC, the mass transit application which won Best Mobility App in the NYC BigApps 3.0 competition, received investment from BMW i Ventures in 2012 and was acquired by Apple in 2013.

Yet like many app competitions driven by government data, many of the winning apps have not developed into viable companies. One challenge that civic hacking competitions face is that “they rely on programmers to define problems, instead of citizens or even government itself.”  Hana Schank wrote of the 2011 contest that “the problem with the [2011] BigApps contest is that it leaves both user needs and likely user behavior out of the equation, instead beginning with an enormous data dump and asking developers to make something cool out of it”. 

Recognizing these challenges, the 2013 BigApps competition introduced specific problem briefs organized around five “BigIssues” related to issues affecting New York City: Jobs and Economic Mobility, Cleanweb: Energy, Environment, and Resilience, Healthy Living, and Lifelong Learning. The competition also included events where organizations and City agencies versed in a “BigIssue” presented data sets and ideas to competitors.

Contest judges 
Judges for the contest have included:
Dawn Barber, Co-founder, New York Tech Meetup; John Borthwick, CEO, Betaworks; Chris Dixon, CEO & Co-founder, Hunch; Jack Dorsey, CEO, Square, and Co-founder, Twitter; Esther Dyson, Chairman, EDventure; Lawrence Lenihan, Founder, CEO and Managing Director of FirstMark Capital; Naveen Selvadurai, Co-founder, Foursquare; Steven Strauss, Managing Director, NYCEDC; Kara Swisher, Co-Executive Director, All Things Digital; Fred Wilson, Managing Partner, Union Square Ventures.

References

Further reading 
 Alan Fever, The Mayor's Geek Squad, NY Times, March 23, 2013
 Erin Durkin, Mayor Michael Bloomberg employs innovative contest style to bring bright, new ideas to meet city challenges, NYDailyNews, February 10, 2013
 John Leland,Turning Unused Acres Green, NY Times, April 29, 2012
 Phyllis Furman, Mayor hands out prizes to local software developers who turn NYC data into easy-to-use apps, NYDailyNews, April 18, 2012
 Joshua Brustein, Contest Whose Winners May Not Succeed, NY Times, March 2, 2012
 Joshua Brustein, In M.T.A. App Contest, Many Buttons Worth Pushing, NY Times, January 6, 2012
 Brad Stenger, "Scene Near Me" Hackers: From BigApps to TimesOpen, NY Times, November 21, 2011
 Brad Stenger, TimesOpen: Social Media on Nov 14, NY Times, November 4, 2011
 Joshua Brustein, Want to Join Me for a Game? Anyone? NY Times, September 30, 2011
 Joshua Brustein, Commuter Reports From, Well, Commuters, NY Times, April 29, 2011
 Patrick McGeehan, Bloomberg Announces Investment in Tech Start-Up, NY Times, May 25, 2010
 Associated Press,Subway finder wins BigApps competition, NY Post, February 8, 2010
 Adam Lisberg, New award-winning phone app, Wayfinder NYC, points the (sub)way, NYDailyNews, February 5, 2010
 Jenna Wortham, New York City Names Winners of Apps Contest, NY Times, February 4, 2010
 Robert Johnson, Techies show off big app-etites for city info, NYDailyNews, December 28, 2009
 Sewell Chan, City Errantly Releases Private Data Gathered in 'Apps' Contest, NY Times, October 7, 2009
 Sewell Chan, City Admits Lapse in Data Release, NY Times, October 7, 2009
 Emily S. Rueb, When Road Rage Turns Into a Brawl, NY Times, October 6, 2009
 Jenna Wortham, New York City Wants You to Create an App For That, NY Times, October 6, 2009
 Sewell Chan and Patrick MCgeehan, City Invites Software Developers to Crunch Big Data Sets, NY Times, June 29, 2009

External links 
 Official website

Competitions in New York City